An anti-nihilistic novel is a form of novel from late 19th-century Russian literature, that came as a reaction to the disillusioned attitudes of the Russian nihilist movement and revolutionary socialism of the 1860s and 1870s. The genre was influential in shaping subsequent ideas on nihilism as a philosophy and cultural phenomenon. Its name derives from the historical usage of the word nihilism as broadly applied to revolutionary movements within the Russian Empire at the time.

In the more formulaic works of this genre, the typical protagonist is a nihilist student. In contrast to the Chernyshevskian character of Rakhmetov however, the nihilist is weak-willed and is easily seduced into subversive activities by a villain, often a Pole (in reference to Polish insurrectionary efforts against the Russian Empire).
The more meritous works of this genre managed to explore nihilism with less caricature. Many anti-nihilistic novels were published in the conservative literary magazine The Russian Messenger edited by Mikhail Katkov.

Background 

Nihilism came into conflict with Orthodox religious authorities, as well as with the Tsarist autocracy. Young radicals began calling themselves nihilists in university protests, innocuous youthful rebellions, and ever-escalating revolutionary activities, which included widespread arson. The theoretic side of nihilism was somewhat distinct from this violent expression however. Nevertheless, nihilism was widely castigated by conservative publicists and government authorities. Fathers and Sons is sometimes considered a more sympathetic work of the anti-nihilistic genre, as with Dostoevsky's The Brothers Karamazov; Turgenev's own opinion of his nihilist character Bazarov was ambivalent, stating: "Did I want to abuse Bazarov or extol him? I do not know myself, since I don't know whether I love him or hate him."

List of anti-nihilistic novels

See also 
 Existentialism
 Superfluous man
 Themes in Fyodor Dostoevsky's writings

Notes

References 

25. Терехин, Валерий. "Против течений" : утаенные русские писатели : типология "антинигилистического" романа. 3-е изд. // Терёхин В.Л. Утаённые русские писатели : [монографии, статьи]. М.: Знак, 2009. - C. 3-114 [Valeriĭ Terekhin. "Protiv techeniĭ" : utaennye russkie pisateli : tipologii͡a "antinigilisticheskogo" romana.  Utaënnye russkie pisateli : [monografii, statʹi].Moskva: Znak, 2009. - C. 3-114]

Further reading 

19th-century Russian literature
Literary genres
+